The House of Tomorrow is a 2017 American independent comedy-drama film written and directed by Peter Livolsi and starring Asa Butterfield and Alex Wolff.  The film is based on Peter Bognanni's 2010 novel of the same name.  It is Livolsi's directorial debut.  Co-stars Ellen Burstyn and Nick Offerman served as executive producers of the film.

Plot
Sebastian Prendergast lives in a dated tourist spot called the House of Tomorrow with his grandmother Josephine. Sebastian longs to leave his isolated existence which quickly changes when he meets Jared Whitcomb, a young up-and-coming punk rocker with a heart condition, and his sister Meredith. Inspired to rebel, Sebastian decides to pick up a guitar and join Jared in becoming a punk rock group.

Cast
Asa Butterfield as Sebastian Prendergast, Josephine's grandson and Jared's friend
Alex Wolff as Jared Whitcomb, Sebastian's friend, Meredith's brother and Alan's son
Nick Offerman as Alan Whitcomb, Meredith and Jared's father
Ellen Burstyn as Josephine Prendergast, Sebastian's grandmother, obsessed by all things Buckminster Fuller, even providing retro-futurist tours of her geodesic home, including authentic video of Buckminster Fuller talking and sailing with Ellen Burstyn, who had actually befriended him in real life.
Maude Apatow as Meredith Whitcomb, Jared's sister and Alan's daughter
Michaela Watkins as Mrs. Whitcomb, Meredith and Jared's mother and Alan's wife
Fred Armisen as Tour Video Narrator (voice)

Production
The film was shot in Minnesota.

Reception
The film has a 74% rating on Rotten Tomatoes, based on 35 reviews with an average score of 6.27/10. The website's critics consensus reads: "Familiar yet endearing, The House of Tomorrow is a well-told coming-of-age comedy that marks an auspicious if not indispensable debut from writer-director Peter Livolsi." Colin Covert of the Star Tribune awarded the film four stars. Leah Greenblatt of Entertainment Weekly graded the film a B. Jeffrey M. Anderson of Common Sense Media gave the film three stars out of five. Both Susan Wloszczyna of RogerEbert.com and Barbara VanDenburgh of The Arizona Republic gave it three stars. Wes Greene of Slant Magazine awarded the film two and a half stars out of four. Joe Friar of The Victoria Advocate awarded the film three stars out of four.

Sheri Linden of The Hollywood Reporter gave the film a positive review, calling it "a confident and perfectly cast debut feature."

Robert Abele of TheWrap also gave the film a positive review and wrote, "what makes the movie organically enjoyable outside of its expected direction is that the manifestation of Sebastian's and Jared's mutually beneficial attachment is, in Livolsi's hands, a delicate simmer instead of a sentimental splash, and tended to with plenty of deadpan wit and honest feeling."

Walter Addiego of the San Francisco Chronicle gave the film a negative review and wrote "Part of what's missing in The House of Tomorrow is the acerbic punk spirit that inspires its two heroes, which could have been remedied by a sharper script."

References

External links
 
 

American drama films
Films based on American novels
2017 films
2017 directorial debut films
Films scored by Rob Simonsen
Films shot in Minnesota
American independent films
2017 independent films
2010s English-language films
2010s American films